Borderless selling is the process of selling services to clients outside the country of origin of services through modern methods which eliminate the actions specifically designed to hinder international trade. International trade through "borderless selling" is a new phenomenon born in the current "globalization" era.

Definitions
Borderless selling is defined as the process of performing sales transaction between two or more parties from different countries (an exporter and an importer) which is free from actions specifically designed to hinder international trade, such as tariff barriers, currency restrictions, and import quotas.

Background
International trade, which is the exchange of goods and services across international borders, has been present throughout much of history of economics, society and politics. 

It is assumed that offshore outsourcing gave birth to "borderless selling". The selling of services by offshore outsourcing service providers to foreign clients is free from actions specifically designed to hinder international trade, such as tariff barriers, currency restrictions, and import quotas. This is largely because most of the services are sold or delivered electronically from the offshore service provider to the foreign client. This phenomenon gave birth to borderless selling.

There is a high correlation between outsourcing and exporting activity. However, borderless selling is different from free international trade or selling. Under the belief in mercantilism, most nations had high tariffs and many restrictions on international trade for centuries. In the 19th century, a belief in free trade became paramount in the west, especially in Britain and this outlook has since then dominated the thinking of western nations. Traditionally international trade was possible between only those countries which regulated international trade through bilateral treaties. Borderless selling is possible between any two countries of the world because services can be exported using modern telecommunication networks without the need to regulate trade.

Major elements 

Consultative sales
Business development 
Account management
Offshore project management
Onshore service delivery

Applicable services 

Many services can be sold through borderless selling, popularly including:
Consulting
Freelancing
Electronic commerce
Online credit card processing
Music
Animation services
Videos
Business research
Telemarketing
Accounting
Medical transcription

See also  
Business process outsourcing
Free trade 
Globality
Globalization
International trade
KPO
Marketing
Offshore outsourcing
Offshoring
Outsourcing 
Sales

References 

Research